Carbia moderata is a moth in the  family Geometridae. It is found on Borneo and Peninsular Malaysia. The habitat consists of lowland areas.

Adults are brownish grey with uniform hindwings.

References

Moths described in 1866
Eupitheciini
Moths of Asia